The 2002 United States Grand Prix (formally the 2002 SAP United States Grand Prix) was a Formula One motor race held on 29 September 2002 at Indianapolis Motor Speedway in Speedway, Indiana.

Background 
The race was noted as one of the rare times in which Bernd Mayländer was unable to drive the Safety Car, resulting in Damien Faulkner taking over the role for one race. With both season titles already in Ferrari's grasp, promoters for the race urged fans to come "see history in the making" and described five-time World Champion Michael Schumacher as "a sports legend...one of the greatest racing drivers...of all time."

Practice and qualifying

Despite heavy rain early Friday morning, the track was dry for the first practice and remained that way all weekend. On his first lap, Barrichello became the first Formula 1 driver in three years of running at the Indianapolis Motor Speedway to hit the concrete wall in the oval section of the track. As he was about to finish his first lap, his left rear tire lost pressure and the car was flung into the outer wall at the top of the main straight, ripping off the left rear corner and front wing. Barrichello's car missed the energy-absorbing Steel And Foam Energy Reduction (SAFER) barrier that had been installed in front of the concrete wall in all of the oval turns the previous May. The Ferrari went across the grass at the bottom of Turn 13, up the banking, and hit the bare concrete wall at the beginning of the straight. Schumacher topped the charts in every practice session. Eddie Irvine, fresh off a podium finish at the Italian GP, showed promise for Jaguar by posting the second best time on Friday, just ahead of the two McLarens, as Williams struggled to get in the top 10. 

On Saturday, Schumacher set a new qualifying record of 1:10.790. Coulthard edged Montoya for third spot on his last lap by one one-thousandth of a second. Williams took fourth (Montoya) and fifth (Ralf Schumacher), while Irvine could do no better than thirteenth.

Qualifying classification

Race 
Rubens Barrichello took the win by 0.011 seconds from teammate Michael Schumacher, with the two Ferrari drivers switching positions in the final few metres of the race after Schumacher attempted to stage a dead heat with his teammate at the finish. It was the smallest margin of victory in an American Grand Prix, and the closest margin in a Formula One race since the introduction of timing to the nearest thousandth of a second.

It was Ferrari's eighth one-two finish of the season. Barrichello said "To win, it was very, very, very good... I got to the last corner, I didn't know what to do and nothing has been said. Michael was just very kind to, you know, let us finish equally. I guess I pointed a little bit in front, but, you know, what can we say?" Schumacher said "The end of the race was not planned... We tried to cross the line together but failed by a tiny bit and in fact we did not know who had won until we got out of the cars. I just felt Rubens deserved to win this race."

The Ferrari team had stated before the weekend that their drivers would not be subject to team orders in the race. From the start, Schumacher led Barrichello and, apart from a brief stint before Coulthard's only pit stop, they completely separated themselves from the rest of the field. The gap between the two leaders varied from one to four seconds.

Ralf Schumacher had made a much better start than Montoya and jumped ahead of his teammate off the grid and through the first corner. As they came down the front straight to start the second lap, however, with their BMW engines turning over 19,000 RPM, the fastest ever by any car in the history of the Speedway, the two collided. Montoya pulled ahead on the outside of Schumacher approaching the turn and so had the better line. When Schumacher turned into the corner from his inside position, he ran over the plastic curbing and his rear end slid around and hit the side of Montoya's car as it went by. Schumacher subsequently made a pit stop for a new rear wing. "[Ralf] made a mistake and went wide on the last right hand before the straight, so I got behind him and drafted him," Montoya said. "I went around the outside to pass him and braked really late, and I think he spun. I'm not going to say it was completely Ralf's fault. I mean, we were racing and everything...I know I gave him plenty of room because I was right on the edge of the track. Because I braked so late, I nearly didn't even make the corner. I braked really late, just made the corner, and something hit me in the back. When I looked in the mirror, I saw Ralf."

Pedro de la Rosa parked his stalled car next to the road leading to the pit. Upon getting out, he was told by the marshals to jump over the barrier. He did so, and fell six feet into a small river. He complained about the episode to the press afterward, saying the marshals did not tell him what was behind the barrier.

Montoya was unscathed by the incident and may have been able to challenge for third spot, but he misunderstood a pit board message and came in for his only stop ten laps too early. "I saw a sign out and I thought I had to come in and the crew didn't know I was coming. Unluckily, it wasn't the time to come in yet." The delay in servicing the car and the damage to their one-stop strategy meant Montoya was racing for fourth place from that point.

When the pitstops were over (two for Ferrari on Bridgestones, one for McLaren and Williams on Michelins), David Coulthard was behind Barrichello by the length of the main straight but secure in third place. Montoya closed the gap toward the end of the race, but did not threaten last podium position. "For the last 40 laps, I was not pushing as hard as I could have done because I chose to look after my engine," Coulthard said afterwards. Jarno Trulli and Jacques Villeneuve battled throughout the race and finished fifth and sixth.

In the post-race interviews, the Ferrari drivers changed their story of what had happened at the finish several times. Earlier in the year Barrichello had been ordered to let Schumacher past on the final lap so he could win the 2002 Austrian Grand Prix. With the Driver's Championship long since secured by Schumacher, it was believed that he was returning the favour to Barrichello at this race.

Race classification

Notes 
 This was the only race where F1 Digital+ graphics were available free on the normal channels, such as ITV.

Championship standings after the race

Drivers' Championship standings

Constructors' Championship standings

Note: Only the top five positions are included for both sets of standings.

References

United States Grand Prix
2002
United States Grand Prix, 2002
United States Grand Prix
Grand Prix
Grand Prix